Butomus is the only known genus in the  plant family Butomaceae, native to Europe and Asia.  It is considered invasive in some parts of the United States.

Taxonomy 
The Butomaceae family has been recognized by most taxonomists as a plant family; it is sometimes called the "flowering-rush family".

The APG II system, of 2003 (unchanged from the APG system, 1998), also recognizes such a family, and places it in the order Alismatales, in the clade monocots.  
At the ranks of family and order, this is the same placement as in the Cronquist system.  However, Cronquist assumed a much smaller order and assigned the order to subclass Alismatidae, in class Liliopsida [=monocotyledons].

Species  
The family counts one species, Butomus umbellatus, or two according to some authorities. 
Butomus umbellatus L. - China, Central Asia, Indian Subcontinent, Middle East, Russia, Europe; naturalized in North America

Butomus umbellatus var. junceus (Turcz.) Micheli - Central Asia (also known as Butomus junceus Turcz.)

References

External links 
 Butomaceae in L. Watson and M.J. Dallwitz (1992 onwards) The families of flowering plants: descriptions, illustrations, identification, information retrieval. Version: 27 April 2006. https://web.archive.org/web/20070103200438/http://delta-intkey.com/.
 Monocot families (United States Department of Agriculture)
 National Center for Biotechnology Information Taxonomy Browser
 links at CSDL, Texas A&M University

Butomaceae of Mongolia in FloraGREIF

Alismatales